Coumba D. Sow is a Senegalese agroeconomist and public policy specialist .
She is the United Nations Food and Agriculture Organization Representative and Country Director in Rwanda

Education
Sow trained at Sciences Po Paris, the University of London and in agrifood in Montpellier.

Career
Sow joined the United Nations in 2006 as FAO Agricultural Policy Officer. She then became in 2013 Africa Manager at the Office of the Director-General of FAO. Since 2017, she has been in charge of emergency humanitarian and resilience actions, for the FAO, in the West Africa and Sahel sub-region.

Coumba D. Sow works to improve the livelihoods of vulnerable populations in the Sahel, whose food and nutritional security is regularly threatened. She defends the use of endogenous knowledge of the populations themselves, including agroecology and country investments to reduce vulnerabilities and create the conditions for the development of agriculture.

In 2018, it launched the FAO initiative: 1 million cisterns for the Sahel. The initiative aims to facilitate access to water for rural communities exposed to climate change. It is inspired by the Brazilian experience from the Fome Zero program.

She participates, invited by Achille Mbembe and Felwine Sarr in the "Ateliers de la pensée", an event bringing together researchers, artists and civil society actors to reflect on the challenges of the African continent and the world10. Coumba D. Sow dealt with Climate resilience and ancestral knowledge in the Sahel alongside Kako Nubukpo, Alioune Sall Paloma, Emmanuel Ndoye.

She is co-author in 2019 with José Graziano da Silva, former Director-General of FAO, of the book From Fome Zero to Zero Hunger: A global perspective

References 

Senegalese economists
Senegalese human rights activists
Year of birth missing (living people)
Living people